Etchmiadzin or Ejmiatsin may refer to:

Vagharshapat, Armenia, a city in Armenia also known as Etchmiadzin (or Ejmiatsin, Echmiatsin or Echmiadzin)
Etchmiadzin Cathedral, Mother Cathedral of Holy Etchmiadzin of the Armenian Apostolic Church
Mother See of Holy Etchmiadzin, of the Armenian Apostolic Church, located in the city
Etchmiadzin, monthly publication of Mother See of Holy Etchmiadzin 
Echmiadzin Gospels, a 10th-century Armenian Gospel Book
Ejmiatsin Church, Tbilisi, an 18th-century Armenian church
Etchmiadzin uezd, a county of the Erivan Governorate of the Russian Empire